Ashley Hay (born 1971) is an Australian writer. She has won awards for both her nonfiction science writing and her novels.  she is editor of the Griffith Review.

Career 
Hay is the author of three novels, including The Railwayman's Wife, joint winner of the 2013 Colin Roderick Award and the 2014 People's Choice Award at the New South Wales Premier's Literary Awards.

She won The Bragg UNSW Press Prize for Science Writing in 2016 for her essay "A Forest at the Edge of Time", having previously been a runner-up to Jo Chandler for the inaugural award in 2012.

Hay was appointed editor of the Griffith Review in 2018, while founding editor Julianne Schultz took on the publisher's role.

Hay's essays and reviews have been published in journals such as The Adelaide Review, Australian Book Review, The Bulletin, Griffith Review, The Independent Monthly, Island, Southerly and Sydney Pen Magazine, as well as in The Sydney Morning Herald and The Australian newspapers.

Works

Novels

Nonfiction

References

External links 

1971 births
Living people
21st-century Australian women writers
Australian science writers
21st-century Australian novelists